Marek Bečka is the founder of Buchty a Loutky puppet company ("Cakes and Puppets") and lecturer in puppetry at Department of Alternative and Puppet Theatre of the Theatre Faculty of Academy of Performing Arts in Prague, Czech Republic.

Artistic contribution 
Bečka is a lecturer in puppetry who has been invited to give master classes in Hong Kong and the Netherlands. Bečka is a graduate of the Prague Academy of Performing Arts in Puppetry. He is also a skilled director and writer. His vision has seen the founding of Buchty a Loutky ("Cakes and Puppets") puppet company in 1991, which has presented over many years a great range of offerings including Rocky IX and Tibet. Buchty a Loutky is famous all over Europe through its tours.

References

Books and articles

Year of birth missing (living people)
Living people
Czech puppeteers
Czech designers
Performing arts presenters